John Frederick Clarke FRS (1 May 1927 – 11 June 2013) was a professor, an aeronautical engineer, and a pilot.

Biography
After his schooling, he got training from Fleet Air Arm as a Navy Pilot and then from Royal Air force at Lossiemouth. He left Navy and worked few months at Armstrong Siddeley Motors, but his interest were in academics. Subsequently he quit the job and joined Queen Mary College in Aeronautical engineering course in 1949. He married Jean Gentle in 1953. His thesis advisor Norman A.V. Piercy died in 1953, then he temporarily advised by Leslie G. Whitehead and then finally by Alec David Young. He received his PhD at Queen Mary College in 1957. He briefly worked for English Electric company from 1955 to 1957. In 1958 he joined Cranfield University as a lecturer and stayed there till 1991. After his retirement he continued to do research for a decade. His research interests were Shock waves, detonations, gas dynamics, flame theory etc.

Awards and honours
Clarke was elected a Fellow of the Royal Society in 1982. His nomination reads:

Books

See also

References

Fellows of the Royal Society
Fluid dynamicists
1927 births
2013 deaths